Goian may refer to:

 Goian, Transnistria, a commune in Transnistria, Moldova
 Goian Island, Dubăsari district, Transnistria, Moldova
 Goian, a village in Ciorescu commune, Chişinău, Moldova

People with the surname
 Dorin Goian, Romanian footballer playing for Palermo
 Lucian Goian, Romanian footballer playing for Dinamo Bucureşti

Romanian-language surnames